The Bundesstraße 54 or B54 is a German federal highway running in a north–south direction from the Dutch border near Gronau to the Hessian state capital Wiesbaden.

See also

Dortmund

References

External links

Roads in Hesse
Roads in North Rhine-Westphalia
054